The southern hawker or blue hawker (Aeshna cyanea) is a species of hawker dragonfly.

Distribution
The species is one of the most common and most widespread dragonflies in Europe. The total range is West Palearctic and covers a large part of Europe (to Scotland and southern Scandinavia in the North to Italy (without the Southwest) and the northern Balkans to the South); the Eastern boundary is formed by the Ural and the West by Ireland. It is also found in Northwest Africa (Algeria). In Central Europe the species is very common.

Habitat
These dragonflies mainly inhabit well-vegetated, small ponds and garden ponds, but they wander widely, and they are often seen in gardens and open woodland.

Description

It is a large, brightly coloured dragonfly, with a long body. The thorax is brown, with two ante-humeral wide green longitudinal stripes. On the forehead there is a black spot in the form of the letter T. The wings are hyaline with a dark pterostigma. The leading edge of the wings is dark.

Males have a dark abdomen with bright apple green markings, except for the last segments S8-10 of the abdomen, where the markings are pale blue and joined. In the females, the abdomen is brownish with bright green markings. The eyes of the males are blue or greenish-blue, while in the females they are yellowish green or brownish.

Biology and behavior
Flight period of these insects lasts from June to October, with some specimen visible in May and November. The adults of the southern hawker  feed on  various insects, caught on the wing.  This is an inquisitive species and will approach people.

These dragonflies breed in still or slow-flowing water. The males are often seen patrolling by a ponds edge or river, where they fight away intruders, crashing into rival males and spiralling through the air. The females are quite inconspicuous when they lay their eggs, but they sometimes give away their spot by clattering up from the reeds.

The eggs are laid by jabbing the abdomen into rotting vegetation or wood. The eggs hatch in the spring, after being laid in the previous summer or autumn. The nymphs feed on aquatic insects, small tadpoles, invertebrates and small fish. They emerge as adults in July and August after two-three years’ development.

Life cycle

See also
 List of British dragonflies
 Schorr, M. and Paulson, D. 2015. World Odonata List. Tacoma, Washington, USA .

References

External links
 
 

Aeshnidae
Odonata of Africa
Dragonflies of Europe
Insects described in 1764
Taxa named by Otto Friedrich Müller